The Single Team Club Competition is a knock-out cup competition in the sport of shinty. It was first competed for in 2022. Col-Glen Shinty Club were the first winners. Whether the trophy gains another name or sponsor in future remains to be seen.

History

The Camanachd Association established the Single Team Club Competition in 2022. Only clubs with one team could enter. This was to provide a new-level of competition for these clubs, with the opportunity to win silverware.

The competition was divided into North and South sections. The North section contained Glengarry, Strathspey, Lochcarron, Aberdeen University, Lochcarron, Boleskine and Lewis. The South section contained Kilmory, Col-Glen, Ballachulish, Cruachanside, Ardnamurchan, Tayforth and Strachur-Dunoon. Glengarry and Col-Glen would meet in the final held in Taynuilt.

Winners and Finals

2022 Col-Glen 2, Glengarry 1, at The Sports Field, Taynuilt

External Links

 [https://www.pressreader.com/uk/the-oban-times/20220714/282428467905221 Final preview from 2022 Oban Times

Shinty
Sport in Highland (council area)
Team sports
Sport in Argyll and Bute